Dulaney may refer to:

Dulaney, Kentucky, an unincorporated community in Caldwell County
Mike Faulkerson Dulaney, an American football fullback
Dulaney High School, a high school in Timonium, Maryland

See also
 Dulaney (disambiguation)